The United States District Court for the Western District of Arkansas (in case citations, W.D. Ark.) is a federal court in the Eighth Circuit (except for patent claims and claims against the U.S. government under the Tucker Act, which are appealed to the Federal Circuit).

The District was established on March 3, 1851, with the division of the preceding United States District Court for the District of Arkansas into an Eastern  and Western district.

The U.S. Courthouse & Post Office in Texarkana is shared with the Eastern District of Texas, making it the sole federal courthouse located in two states and a location of two federal districts. 

The United States Attorney's Office for the Western District of Arkansas represents the United States in civil and criminal litigation in the court. , the current United States Attorney is David Clay Fowlkes.

Organization of the court
The United States District Court for the Western District of Arkansas is one of two federal judicial districts in Arkansas. Court for the District is held at El Dorado, Fayetteville, Fort Smith, Harrison, Hot Springs, and Texarkana.

El Dorado Division comprises the following counties: Ashley, Bradley, Calhoun, Columbia, Ouachita, and Union.

Fayetteville Division comprises the following counties: Benton, Madison, and Washington.

Fort Smith Division comprises the following counties: Crawford, Franklin, Johnson, Logan, Polk, Scott, and Sebastian.

Harrison Division comprises the following counties: Baxter, Boone, Carroll, Marion, Newton, and Searcy.

Hot Springs Division comprises the following counties: Clark, Garland, Hot Spring, Montgomery, and Pike.

Texarkana Division comprises the following counties: Hempstead, Howard, Lafayette, Little River, Miller, Nevada, and Sevier.

Current judges
:

Vacancies and pending nominations

Former judges

Chief judges

Succession of seats

See also
 Courts of Arkansas
 List of current United States district judges
 List of United States federal courthouses in Arkansas

References

External links
 United States District Court for the Western District of Arkansas
 United States Attorney for the Western District of Arkansas

Arkansas West
Arkansas law
Courts and tribunals established in 1851
1851 establishments in Arkansas
Fayetteville, Arkansas
Fort Smith, Arkansas
Hot Springs, Arkansas
Harrison, Arkansas micropolitan area
Texarkana, Arkansas